Silvio Argüello Cardenal (born 2 December 1929) is a politician and attorney from Nicaragua who served as Vice President of Nicaragua from May 1963 to May 1967 and leader of Nationalist Liberal Party. During the presidency of René Schick, he was in charge of the Ministry of Economy, Industry and Commerce.

From 1967 to 1972, he held a seat in the National Congress of Nicaragua and in 1974 he was part of the national constituent assembly.

He also served as Member of National Assembly of Nicaragua. Argüello emigrated to Florida by 1986 and works as attorney.

References 

Vice presidents of Nicaragua
Nationalist Liberal Party politicians
Members of the National Assembly (Nicaragua)
Government ministers of Nicaragua
1929 births
Living people